is a train station located in Ogōri, Fukuoka.
The station opened on April 12, 1924.

Lines 

Nishi-Nippon Railroad
Tenjin Ōmuta Line

Platforms

Adjacent stations 

|-
|colspan=5|

Notes

Railway stations in Fukuoka Prefecture
Railway stations in Japan opened in 1924